George William Ernest Crosbie (December 6, 1909 – July 27, 1979) was an American race walker.

Crosbie competed in the 50 km walk at the Summer Olympics in 1932, 1936 and 1948, with a best finish of eighth in 1932. He won the 50 km walk at the United States Olympic Trials three times.

References

1909 births
1979 deaths
American male racewalkers
Athletes (track and field) at the 1932 Summer Olympics
Athletes (track and field) at the 1936 Summer Olympics
Athletes (track and field) at the 1948 Summer Olympics
Olympic track and field athletes of the United States